Nasser Adel Al-Ojail (born December 30, 1996) is a Saudi footballer who plays for Radwa as a full back.

References

External links 
 

1996 births
Living people
Saudi Arabian footballers
Hajer FC players
Al-Nojoom FC players
Al Omran Club players
Al-Rawdhah Club players
Radwa Club players
Association football fullbacks
Saudi First Division League players
Saudi Professional League players
Saudi Fourth Division players
Saudi Second Division players
Saudi Third Division players